Lucien Camille Golvin (18 July 1905 at Villebougis (Yonne) – 6 of July, 2002) was a noted French university professor who specialized in the study of art from the peoples of the Maghreb.

Biography 
After spending his childhood at Yonne and his formative tertiary education years at Joigny, he left for Tunisia in 1929 to receive a professorship. After ten years, he received a nomination to be Regional Director of the Arts and Tradition at Sfax. His knowledge of tribal Arab culture and personable self, led to take the organization to new heights. There, he founded the Dar Jellouli Museum and during the sombre years of the Second World War, received a philosophy degree.

The next big development in his career came in Algeria when he took a position, from 1946 to 1957, as Director of Artisan Services to the General Government. There he founded 3 more museums, this time Ethnographic Museums in Oran, Algeria and Constantine. He met Georges Marçais who inspired him to follow a different route with him; to do archaeological research as a team at Kalâa of Béni Hammad on the site of the palace of the Ziri at Achir. In 1954, he submitted his grand thesis to the University of Algeria. From 1957 to 1962, he occupied the role of the Chairman of Islamic Art and Civilization in at the faculty of Social Sciences. From 1962 to 1977, he was a professor at the Université d'Aix-Marseille where he was the Chairman of the Arts and the Chairman of Arabic Archeology.

He also led several scientific missions later in his career. From Balis-Meskéné (Syria) to Thula (Yemen) and Fes (Morocco).

Golvin was the father of the architect, archeologist and watercolorist Jean-Claude Golvin and of the artist Jacques Golvin.

Selected works/books
 Artisans sfaxiens. Étude technique et sociale sur l'artisanat tunisien. Notes de folklore et lexique par Lucien Golvin et A. Louis, éd. Institut des belles lettres arabes, Tunis, 1946
 Les tissages décorés d'El Djem et de Djébéniana. Étude de sociologie tunisienne, éd. Institut des belles lettres arabes, Tunis, 1949
 Les arts populaires en Algérie. Série d'études techniques et sociales, pub. Gouvernement général de l'Algérie, Alger, 6 tomes, 1949–1956
 Le Maghrib central à l'époque des Zirides. Recherche d'archéologie et d'histoire, pub. Gouvernement général de l'Algérie, éd. Arts et métiers graphiques, Paris, 1957
 Aspects de l'artisanat en Afrique du Nord, éd. Presses universitaires de France, Paris, 1957
 Essai sur l'architecture religieuse musulmane, éd. Klincksieck, Paris, 4 tomes, 1970–1979
 Palais et demeures d'Alger à la période ottomane, éd. Édisud, Aix-en-Provence, 1991

References

Historians of Islamic art
North Africa
1905 births
2002 deaths
People from Yonne
French art historians
French male non-fiction writers
20th-century French male writers
French expatriates in Tunisia